The white-necked crow (Corvus leucognaphalus) is the largest of the four Caribbean corvids. It is endemic to the island of Hispaniola (split between Haiti and the Dominican Republic); it was formerly also extant on Puerto Rico, but has been extirpated there due to considerable forest clearance and hunting.

Taxonomy
Two other species, the Cuban crow (C. nasicus) and the Jamaican crow (C. jamaicensis), appear to be very closely related to it, sharing several key morphological features. The fourth species from this region, the palm crow (C. palmarum), would appear to be a later arrival (at least in evolutionary terms) and shows similarities to the fish crow (C. ossifragus) of North America and two Mexican species, despite it being sympatric with the white-necked crow on Hispaniola.

Description

The overall appearance is black, with a bluish-purple gloss in good light; despite the name, the neck typically appears entirely black, as the namesake white is restricted to the bases of the neck feathers, rarely visible in the field. The black bill is long and deep, and curves gently downward to the tip, giving the bird a large headed appearance. The nasal bristles do not quite cover the nostrils, unlike the majority of species in this genus. There is a patch of dark grey bare skin behind the eye, and the base of the lower mandible has a bare strip of the same coloured skin. The iris is a distinctive crimson red in colour, and the legs and feet are black. It often flies high over the forest canopy and soars on thermals, unlike the palm crow, which rarely, if ever, soars.

Conservation
It has been designated as "Vulnerable" by the IUCN, due to having a severely fragmented population which is mostly decreasing, and several other threats (mainly hunting for both food and as a crop pest, destruction of habitat for agriculture and timber, and attacks on nest sites by the recently arrived pearly-eyed thrasher (Margarops fuscatus)); the same factors that led to its extirpation on Puerto Rico seem to affect the remaining populations on Hispaniola and surrounding islands.

Habitat
It inhabits both lowland and mountain forest, and tolerates degraded areas used for agriculture.

Diet
The diet is typical of most forest crows, comprising a large amount of fruit but a degree of invertebrate food is also taken, especially when feeding young. Small vertebrate prey has also been found in the stomachs of collected birds, including small native toads and nestlings. Bird eggs are also taken when found.

Reproduction
The nest is always solitary and built high in a tall tree, though little else concerning their breeding has as yet been recorded.

Voice
The voice of the white-necked crow is quite remarkable and unusual for a corvid, described as sounding more like a parrot, and consists of a series of liquid bubbling sounds, squawking, and babbling, mixed with sweet and harsh notes, including some that sound like the common raven (Corvus corax).

References

External links
 BirdLife Species Factsheet.
 Two birds in palm tree
 Head shot
 Single bird calling

white-necked crow
Endemic birds of the Caribbean
Endemic birds of Hispaniola
Birds of Hispaniola
Birds of the Dominican Republic
Birds of Haiti
white-necked crow
white-necked crow
ESA endangered species